Dan Lindsay is a documentary filmmaker. He is the co-director, producer and an editor of the 2011 sports documentary Undefeated, which received the 2011 Oscar for Best Documentary Feature.

Lindsay and T. J. Martin co-directed LA 92 for National Geographic Channel in early 2017. In June 2017, Lindsay was nominated for the Primetime Emmy Award for Exceptional Merit in Documentary Filmmaking.

In 2021, Lindsay and T. J. Martin co-directed a documentary film about the life of singer Tina Turner, titled Tina, for HBO. More recently, he signed a first look deal with Imagine Documentaries.

References

External links

Davy Rothbart Interviews Daniel Lindsay for Grantland

Living people
Directors of Best Documentary Feature Academy Award winners
Year of birth missing (living people)
Place of birth missing (living people)